Liberty Charter School is a public charter high school in Nampa, Idaho, United States. 

This school was the first to embrace the harbor Method of teaching, which is now being adopted by other schools in the state.

References

External links 
 

Public high schools in Idaho
Schools in Canyon County, Idaho
Charter schools in Idaho